Tsui Kwo Yin (Traditional Chinese: 崔國因; Simplified Chinese: 崔国因; Hanyu Pinyin: Cuī Guóyīn) (1831–1909) was the Chinese Minister to the United States, Spain, and Peru from 1889 to 1893. Cui was born in what is today Huangshan City, Anhui Province. The details of his life are not well known beyond a diary that he wrote chronicling his time as Minister.

Cui has generally not been a well-regarded figure in historical accounts. Liang Jian, a historian at Yunnan Normal University, writes that "because he could not speak English, had an introverted personality, and was inept at social intercourse, [Cui] became the butt of jokes and a gossip topic". Historian Michael Hunt believes that Cui was "a lackluster diplomat", because he did not consistently advocate for concrete policies that would assist Chinese citizens living in the United States following the Chinese Exclusion Act of 1882.

References

Qing dynasty diplomats
1909 deaths
Ambassadors of China to the United States
Ambassadors of China to Spain
Ambassadors of China to Peru
1831 births
Politicians from Huangshan
Qing dynasty politicians from Anhui